Ramučiai is a village in Kaunas district municipality, in Kaunas County, in central Lithuania. According to the 2011 census, the town has a population of 2372 people.

Villages in Kaunas County